Everything Means Nothing (stylized in all lowercase) is the fifth studio album by American singer Blackbear, released on August 21, 2020, by Beartrap, Alamo Records and Interscope Records. The entire album was produced by Blackbear and frequent collaborator Andrew Goldstein, alongside additional producers Aaron Harmon, Jordan Reyes and Marshmello, as well as guest appearances from singers Lauv and Trevor Daniel.

Track listing
All tracks written by Matthew Musto and Andrew Goldstein, except where noted. All tracks produced by Blackbear and FRND, except "I Felt That", produced alongside Jordan Reyes and Aaron Harmon, and "Half Alive", produced alongside Marshmello.

 All song titles are stylized in lowercase letters.
 "If I Were U" contains samples from "Enchanted" written by Taylor Swift.

Charts

Certifications

References

2020 albums
Blackbear (musician) albums
Interscope Records albums